There are two main types of congressional committees in the United States House of Representatives, standing committees and select committees. Committee chairs are selected by whichever party is in the majority, and the minority party selects ranking members to lead them. The committees and party conferences may have rules determining term limits for leadership and membership, though waivers can be issued. While the Democrats and Republicans differ on the exact processes by which committee leadership and assignments are chosen, most standing committees are selected by the respective party steering committees and ratified by the party conferences. The Ethics, House Administration, Rules and all select committees are chosen by the party leaders (Speaker in the majority and Minority Leader in the minority). Most committees are additionally subdivided into subcommittees, each with its own leadership selected according to the full committee's rules. The only standing committee with no subcommittees is the Budget Committee.

The modern House committees were brought into existence through the Legislative Reorganization Act of 1946. This bill reduced the number of House committees, as well as restructured the committees' jurisdictions.

Standing committees

Non-standing committees

Party leadership
Each party determines their committees leads, who serve as chair in the majority and ranking member in the minority. The table below lists the tenure of when each member was selected for their current term as committee lead. The Republican party rules stipulate that their leads of standing committees may serve no more than three congressional terms (two years each) as chair or ranking member unless the full party conference grants them a waiver to do so. The current majority party is listed first for each committee.

See also 
List of United States Senate committees
List of United States congressional joint committees
List of defunct United States congressional committees

References

External links
Committees, House.gov. United States House of Representatives. Includes links to all permanent and joint committees, excepting the Helsinki Commission.
Congressional Directory: Main Page, Government Printing Office Online. Detailed listings of many aspects of previous memberships and sessions of Congress.
Committees of the U.S. Congress. Congress.gov. Library of Congress.
U.S. Congressional Biographical Dictionary
House Committee Repository

House of Representatives Committees